Niko Grünfeld (born March 13, 1975, in Sønderborg) is a Danish politician. He served as Mayor of Culture and Leisure to the Copenhagen Municipality from January to October 2018 for The Alternative political party, which he co-founded in 2013. In April 2020, he co-founded the Independent Greens party and has since served on the Copenhagen City Council for that party.

References 

1975 births
Living people
Danish politicians
The Alternative (Denmark) politicians
Independent Greens (Denmark) politicians
People from Sønderborg